Rhine campaign may refer to:
 Rhine campaign of 1713 during the War of the Spanish Succession
 Rhine Campaign of 1748 during the War of the Austrian Succession
 Rhine campaign of 1792 during the War of the First Coalition, see Campaigns of 1792 in the French Revolutionary Wars#Rhine front (July – 20 September 1792, also known as the "Valmy campaign") and Campaigns of 1792 in the French Revolutionary Wars#Rhineland campaign (21 September – 31 October 1792)
 Rhine campaigns of 1793–94 during the War of the First Coalition
 Rhine campaign of 1795 during the War of the First Coalition
 Rhine campaign of 1796 during the War of the First Coalition

See also 
 Roman campaigns in Germania (12 BC – AD 16)
 Army of the Rhine (1791–1795)
 Army of the Rhine (disambiguation)
 Allied advance from Paris to the Rhine or the Siegfried Line campaign (August 1944 - March 1945) during World War II